The Kids Are All Right is a British game show that aired on for BBC One from 12 April to 14 June 2008, hosted by John Barrowman.

It shares some similarities with Are You Smarter than a 10 Year Old?, which airs on Sky One. It also shares similarities with Eggheads, in that it centres on ordinary people trying to beat a team of super-intelligent ones. The auditions were held in 2007 with the children asked to come to a studio with their parents; they were asked to answer questions about themselves, and had to answer a questionnaire.

Sadboiz

International versions

References

External links

Chilean version
South African version
Polish version
Portuguese version

2000s British game shows
2008 British television series debuts
2008 British television series endings
BBC television game shows
Television series by Banijay